Going Gay is a 1933 British musical film directed by Carmine Gallone and starring Arthur Riscoe,  Naunton Wayne and Magda Schneider. It was made at British and Dominion's Elstree Studios. It was followed by a sequel For Love of You, also released the same year.

Plot
English friends in Vienna are rivals in love for a lady singer, but both unite in their attempts to make her a star of the opera.

Cast
 Arthur Riscoe as Jack  
 Naunton Wayne as Jim  
 Magda Schneider as Grete, a Viennese Girl  
 Ruth Maitland as Mother  
 Victor Fairley as Grete's Father  
 Richard Wydler as Grete's Brother  
 Brenda Senton as Grete's Sister  
 Wilfred Noy as Director of Opera Falkenheim  
 Grete Natzler as Director of Opera's Daughter  
 Joe Hayman as Impresario  
 Bertha Belmore as Masculine Lady at TableTen

References

Bibliography
 Low, Rachael. Filmmaking in 1930s Britain. George Allen & Unwin, 1985.
 Wood, Linda. British Films, 1927-1939. British Film Institute, 1986.

External links
 

1933 films
1933 musical comedy films
Films directed by Carmine Gallone
British musical comedy films
Films shot at Imperial Studios, Elstree
British black-and-white films
1930s British films